The  was the eighth season of the nationwide fourth tier of Japanese football, and the 23rd season since the establishment of Japan Football League.

Clubs

For the first time, 17 clubs have taken part in the JFL season. Last year no relegations were in place in J3, the league had the intent of seeing two more teams joining from the start, but only Tegevajaro Miyazaki got promoted with one game to play and joined J3 for the 2021 season.

Verspah Oita won the JFL for the first time in their history, but were not promoted as they did not hold a J3 license. FC Tiamo Hirakata and FC Kariya won promotion to the JFL by qualifying in the top two spots of the 44th Regional Pro Series. For the Hirataka-based side it was the first time in JFL, but Kariya are back after a twelve-year long hiatus.
There are six teams eligible for promotion with J3 licenses; these are highlighted in green in the following table.

Personnel and kits

Managerial changes

League table

Regional Leagues Relegation Playoffs

Honda Lock remains in the JFL; FC Ise-Shima remains in the Tōkai Adult Soccer League Division 1.

FC Kariya was relegated to the Tōkai Adult Soccer League Division 1; Criacao Shinjuku was promoted to the JFL.

Season statistics

Top scorers
.

See also

Japan Football Association (JFA)
League
Japanese association football league system
J.League
2021 J1 League (Tier 1)
2021 J2 League (Tier 2)
2021 J3 League (Tier 3)
2021 Regional Champions League (play-offs for promotion to JFL)
2021 Regional Leagues (Tier 5/6)
Cup(s)
2021 Fuji Xerox Super Cup (Super Cup)
2021 Emperor's Cup (National Open Cup)
2021 J.League YBC Levain Cup (League Cup)

References

External links
Official website 

Japan Football League seasons
4